James Bartlett (9 July 1966 – 23 May 2022) was a British-born South African actor best known for his role as the wicked puppet master, David Genaro, in Rhythm City and his theatre work.

Career

Television
Bartlett was a well-known South African actor prior to starring in Rhythm City. He started playing his role as David Genaro in 2007. He was the first person to speak in scene 1 on the TV series Isidingo as character Mike O'Riley when it was aired on South African television. On the set of Isidingo, he acted opposite Hlomla Dandala who portrayed Derek Nyathi.

In 1997, Bartlett acted in the action M-Net TV movie The Sexy Girls. The gang-movie genre showcased the realities of the gangster life in Cape Town.

Bartlett also guest starred in the Canadian-South African  TV series Jozi-H, a hospital drama set in Johannesburg. He was also a judge on SA's Got Talent alongside Shadow Twala and DJ Fresh.

Film
Bartlett's movie career began with American movies, 1987 action sequel film American Ninja 2 and subsequently the 1993 American Ninja 5 where he acted alongside Michael Dudikoff and Steve James.

Bartlett also had a supporting role playing Joss in the 2003 romantic drama Beyond Borders, an epic tale of turbulent romance between two star-crossed lovers, with Angelina Jolie.

In the 2004 British film drama Red Dust, Bartlett acted in a supporting role of Dirk Hendricks, a local policeman, opposite Hilary Swank where Academy Award winning director Tom Hooper directed the film. The film, based on the novel Red Dust by Gillian Slovo sees a New York lawyer Sarah Barcant (Hilary Swank) return to the place where she grew up, South Africa. Barcant returns to fight the case of Alex Mpondo (Chiwetel Ejiofor), a black politician who was tortured during the apartheid regime. The truth of the killing of Mpondo's comrade Steve Sizela by Piet Muller (Ian Roberts) is confirmed by Dirk Hendricks (Bartlett).

The 2007 horror thriller Prey, saw Bartlett playing a supporting role as Crawford, a professional hunter and guide. A film where an American family whilst on holiday in South Africa get lost while on a game reserve and are stalked by lions. Crawford's services are enlisted in an attempt to track the lost family, who ventured into the park on a game drive but were surrounded by lions.

Bartlett starred in the 2010 children's parable White Lion , alongside fellow South African Best Actor Tony Award Winner John Kani and Thabo Malema. The film won the SAFTA Awards for Best Cinematography in a feature film, Best Music Composition in a feature film and Best Sound Design in a feature film. Filmed on location at the Kingdom of the White Lion, SA Lion Park, Nash's Farm, Glen Afric and Entabeni Game Reserve, Bartlett played a professional hunter.

Bartlett starred in the movie, Mandela: Long Walk to Freedom based on the 1994 book Long Walk to Freedom, written by Nelson Mandela, the former president of South Africa. In the film, Bartlett played the supporting role of Sergeant James Gregory.

Theatre
Most of Bartlett's theatre work took place at the Market Theatre where he had strong ties during the Apartheid era. The theatre was founded by Mannie Manim and Barney Simon in 1976. It was known internationally as South Africa's "Theatre of the Struggle" and challenged the apartheid regime. Cock and Bull Story marked the beginning of Bartlett's professional career in 1986 where he played the role of a gay boxer and won a Vita Award for Most Promising Actor.

A year later, Bartlett starred in the satire play East in 1987 and won the Fleur du Cap Theatre Award for Best Actor. In 1990, he was directed by Neil McCarthy in Rainshark at the Market Theatre.

Neil McCarthy directed Bartlett in Mojo in 1997 also at the Market Theatre where he won the Vita Best Actor Award. The Great Outdoors starring Bartlett premiered at the Grahamstown Arts Festival in July 2000, where he played the leading role. He had a lead role in the theatre production of The Fire Raisers which toured Switzerland.

Bartlett returned to the Market Theater for Death of a Colonialist  in 2011, where he played the lead role of an eccentric 60-something history teacher, Harold Smith from award-winning playwright Greg Latter's play. Bartlett won the 2010 Naledi Theatre Award for Best Performance by an actor in a Lead Role. The play received positive reviews for its script and acting.

Personal life
Bartlett was born in England to a British father and a South African mother. He was formerly married to actress Camilla Waldman, known for her role in the Generations soap opera. The couple had a son, Hector, and later divorced.

Death 
Jamie Bartlett died suddenly on 23 May 2022, at the age of 55. After an autopsy was performed, it was concluded that Bartlett died from cardiac arrest.

Filmography

Film

Theatre

Television

Awards
The Crystal Award for Best Actor Isidingo
Vita Award for Best Lead Actor The Great Outdoors
Avanti Television Award for Best Actor Isidingo
Vita Award for Best Actor Mojo
Fleur Du Cap Theatre Award for Best Actor East
Vita Theatre Award for Best Up & Coming Actor Cock and Bull Story
South African Film & Television Award (SAFTA) for Best Actor Rhythm City.

Training
Trained in Speech and Drama at the University of Cape Town
Post Graduate Master classes with Peter Bridgemont at Chrysalis Theatre Acting School, London.

References

External links

1966 births
2022 deaths
South African male film actors
South African male television actors
People from Maidenhead
English emigrants to South Africa
20th-century South African male actors
21st-century South African male actors